CJOR (1240 AM, Bounce 1240) is a radio station in Osoyoos, British Columbia. Owned by Bell Media, it broadcasts an adult hits format.

The station operates an FM rebroadcaster on 102.9 MHz as CJOR-FM in Oliver.

History
CKOK Ltd. the original owner launched the station in December 1966 as CKOO. Sometime in the late 1970s or the early 1980s, a rebroadcaster was added in Oliver at 1490 AM with the callsign CKOO-1. In 1984, CKOO and CKOO-1 were authorized to increase night power from 250 to 1,000 watts. In 1991, CKOO and CKOO-1 adopted their current callsigns CJOR and CJOR-1. The CJOR callsign was previously used at an unrelated radio station in Vancouver from 1926 to 1988.

Over the years, the station went through a number of owners and formats. In 1993, CJOR received CRTC approval to convert CJOR-1 Oliver to the FM dial to operate at 102.9 MHz.

In May 2021 as part of a mass reorganization, CJOR flipped to adult hits as Bounce 1240.

References

External links
Bounce 1240

CJOR-AM history - Canadian Communication Foundation

JOR
JOR
Radio stations established in 1966
JOR
1966 establishments in British Columbia